María del Carmen Sotomayor Elzo (c.1780 – September 24, 1852) was First Lady of Chile.

She was born in Rancagua, the daughter of Francisco Sotomayor Serrano and of María de la Concepción de Elzo y Ureta, woman of Basque descent. She married Fernando de Errázuriz y Martínez de Aldunate, served as provisional president of Chile in 1831, in Santiago on October 2, 1801, with whom he had 8 children. She died in the same city on 1852.

See also
First Lady of Chile

External links
Genealogical chart of Sotomayor family 

1780 births
1852 deaths
People from Rancagua
First ladies of Chile